Boreocomitas is a genus of extinct sea snails, marine gastropod mollusks in the family Pseudomelatomidae, the turrids and allies.

Species
Species within the genus Boreocomitas include:
 † Boreocomitas brevior (Koenen, 1885) 
 † Boreocomitas inouei Amano, Hryniewicz & R. G. Jenkins, 2018 
 † Boreocomitas oregonensis (Hickman, 1976)

References

 Kazutaka Amano & Krzysztof Hryniewicz &Robert G Jenkins, A newly discovered Paleocene species of Boreocomitas (Gastropoda: Pseudomelatomidae) from eastern Hokkaido, Japan, with implications for the biogeography of the Paleocene Bering Strait; Nautilus 2018

External links
 Hickman C.S. (1976). Bathyal gastropods of the family Turridae in the early Oligocene Keasey Formation in Oregon, with a review of some deep-water genera in the Paleogene of the eastern Pacific. Bulletins of American Paleontology. 70(292): 1-119

 
Pseudomelatomidae